Hoboken  may refer to:
Hoboken, Antwerp, a district of Antwerp, Belgium 
Hoboken, Alabama, United States
Hoboken, Georgia, United States
Hoboken, New Jersey, United States

People
 Anthony van Hoboken (1887–1983), Dutch musicologist
 Conrad III Schetz, 1st Baron of Hoboken.
 Conrad-Albert, 1st Duke d'Ursel, 1st Duke of Hoboken.

See also
Hoboken-Verzeichnis, catalogue of works by Joseph Haydn as compiled by Anthony van Hoboken
Hoboken Terminal, an intermodal station on the Hudson River
Hoboken Cemetery, North Bergen
West Hoboken, New Jersey